USS Floyd B. Parks (DD-884) was a  in service with the United States Navy from 1945 to 1973. She was scrapped in 1974.

Namesake

Floyd Bruce Parks was born on 16 January 1911 in Salisbury, Missouri, the first child of James B. Parks and his wife Elizabeth Ann Bowman. James Parks was a widower with one son from his first marriage. Floyd Parks also had a younger brother, Billy Bowman Parks, born in 1921. Their father died on 3 February 1924. He enlisted in the United States Navy in 1928 and served two years aboard destroyers. In 1930, he received an appointment to the United States Naval Academy. Parks earned the infamous Black "N" award, given for major infractions, on a number of occasions. He sang in the Midshipman Choir and was a member of Annapolis' water polo team, also participating in football and swimming. He graduated in the upper third of his class of 1934, and chose a commission in United States Marine Corps. He was appointed a second lieutenant on 1 June and assigned to the Philadelphia Navy Yard for a year, before serving on the cruiser . In May 1936, he reported to Naval Air Station Pensacola for flight training. While swimming in the Gulf of Mexico, Parks and an enlisted man rescued a Marine private from drowning, winning commendation for his "quick action, good judgment and swimming ability".

Parks was designated a Naval Aviator on 12 June 1937, and in August reported to Naval Air Station San Diego, California. The following year, he married Margaret Elizabeth Murray of El Paso, Texas. In June 1940, he was reassigned to NAS Pensacola as a flight instructor. In May 1941, he transferred to the First Marine Aircraft Wing, Fleet Marine Force, Quantico, Virginia, and trained as a dive bomber pilot. He remained in that assignment until March 1942, when he joined the Second Marine Aircraft Wing in San Diego for deployment to Midway Atoll.

He was promoted to the rank of Major on 8 May 1942, and given command of Marine Fighting Squadron 221 (VMF-221). The squadron was predominantly equipped with Brewster F2A-3 (Model B-439) fighter aircraft, supplemented by a handful of Grumman F4F-3 Wildcats, all handed down from U.S. Navy squadrons. More than half of the aviators assigned to Parks' unit were fresh from flight training in San Diego. Parks was killed in action on the first day of the Battle of Midway on 4 June 1942, while leading his squadron against a superior force of Japanese fighters and bombers attacking the island. He was posthumously awarded the Navy Cross.

History
The destroyer was laid down by the Consolidated Steel Corporation at Orange, Texas on 30 October 1944, launched on 31 March 1945 by Mrs. Floyd B. Parks, widow of Major Parks and commissioned on 31 July 1945.

Floyd B. Parks arrived at San Diego, her home port, 16 November 1945, and sailed 20 November for her first tour of duty in the Far East, patrolling the coast of China and operating in the Marianas Islands until her return to San Diego 11 February 1947. In the period prior to the outbreak of war in Korea, Floyd B. Parks twice more deployed to the Far East for duty with the US 7th Fleet, returning from her second such cruise 13 June 1950, just before the North Koreans crossed the 38th parallel. At once she prepared to return to duty as a standby at Pearl Harbor, available should war spread, returning to San Diego 20 August.

Korean War
Floyd B. Parks operated with the Seventh Fleet in support of United Nations Forces during the Korean War. She sailed from San Diego 19 February 1951 to join in United Nations operations in Korea. On 16 March she joined the fast carrier task force, screening them during air operations off the east coast as well as spending a total of 60 days in Wonsan Harbor on blockade and bombardment duty. She returned to San Diego 10 October 1951, and after west coast operations, sailed for duty in the Far East again 31 May 1952. Along with duty similar to that of her first war cruise, she patrolled in the South China Sea and the Taiwan Strait.

Cold War
During her 1955 Far Eastern cruise, Floyd B. Parks took part in evacuation of the Dachen Islands during the First Taiwan Strait Crisis, and while in the Orient once more 11 March 1956, collided with the heavy cruiser , losing two men and a  section of her bow. Skillful work by her crew saved their ship, and brought her safely into Naval Station Subic Bay for temporary repairs. Upon her return to Long Beach Naval Shipyard 14 May 1956, Floyd B. Parks''' damaged bow was replaced with that of the uncompleted destroyer  and after completion of repairs and installation of new equipment Floyd B. Parks returned to her west coast-Far East rotation through 1962. She then entered the Puget Sound Naval Shipyard and underwent an extensive Fleet Rehabilitation and Modernization (FRAM) overhaul until February 1963.

Vietnam War
During the Vietnam War, Floyd B. Parks served as plane guard for aircraft carriers on Yankee Station in the Tonkin Gulf, participated in Operation Sea Dragon, patrolled on search and rescue duties, and carried out naval gunfire support missions.Floyd B. Parks'' was decommissioned on 2 July 1973, stricken from the Naval Vessel Register on 2 July 1973, and sold for scrapping on 29 April 1974.

References

 

World War II destroyers of the United States
Cold War destroyers of the United States
Korean War destroyers of the United States
Vietnam War destroyers of the United States
Ships built in Orange, Texas
1945 ships
Gearing-class destroyers of the United States Navy